Seven Sisters, England may refer to:

 Seven Sisters, Sussex: a group of chalk cliffs
 Seven Sisters, London: an area of north London in the London Borough of Haringey, served by Seven Sisters station

See also
 Seven Sisters (disambiguation)